Neil Evitts (born 25 September 1964 in Birmingham, England) is a former speedway rider who finished eighth in the World Championship in 1986 .

In 1986 he also won the British Speedway Championship, then finished runner-up in 1987. That year he also became the captain of England.
Neil finished his career in 1994 riding for the Newcastle Diamonds.

World final appearances

Individual World Championship
 1986 -  Chorzów, Silesian Stadium - 8th - 8pts

World Team Cup
 1986 -  Göteborg, Ullevi and  Vojens, Speedway Center (with Simon Wigg / Kelvin Tatum / Jeremy Doncaster / Chris Morton) - 3rd - 81pts (8)

References

1964 births
Living people
British speedway riders
English motorcycle racers
British Speedway Championship winners
Birmingham Brummies riders
Halifax Dukes riders
Bradford Dukes riders
Stoke Potters riders
Wolverhampton Wolves riders